Limited resources  may refer to:

 Non-renewable resources
 Scarcity
 Embedded systems, computing devices resource availability
 Poverty